Eilema degenerella is a moth of the subfamily Arctiinae first described by Francis Walker in 1863. It is found in Japan and China.

References

degenerella
Moths of Japan